Everything Must Go (Vol. 1) is the sixth official mixtape by American musician T-Pain. It was released on August 17, 2018, as a free digital download through his website.

Track listing 
All tracks written and produced by T-Pain, unless specified.

References 

T-Pain albums
2018 mixtape albums